The Cotton Corporation of India Limited or CCI is a central public sector undertaking under the ownership of the Ministry of Textiles, Government of India, engaged in diverse activities related to trade, procurement, and export of cotton. CCI is a public sector agency responsible for equitable distribution of cotton among the different constituents of the industry and aid imports of cotton. It was incorporated on 31 July 1970 under the Companies Act 1956.

CCI is governed by Textile Policy 1985 issued by the Ministry of Textiles, Government of India.

References

External links
 Times of India

Agricultural marketing in India
Agriculture in Maharashtra
Cotton industry in India
Companies based in Mumbai
Government-owned companies of India
Indian companies established in 1970
Ministry of Textiles
Cotton organizations
Textile companies based in Maharashtra
Agricultural organisations based in India
1970 establishments in Maharashtra